Cyprus is one out of six European Union (EU) member states outside the North Atlantic Treaty Organization (NATO), and the only one not to participate in NATO's Partnership for Peace (PfP) program.

Background

1949-1960: Period within NATO as a British crown colony

From the formation of NATO in 1949 until Cyprus gained its independence in 1960, the territory was a crown colony of the United Kingdom and as such the UK's NATO membership also applied to British Cyprus.

1960-2004: Independence and non-alignment

The Sovereign Base Areas of Akrotiri and Dhekelia in Cyprus remained under British control as a British Overseas Territory following independence. Neighbouring Greece and Turkey competed for influence in the newly independent Cyprus, with intercommunal rivalries and movements for union with Greece or partition and partial union with Turkey. The first President of the independent Republic of Cyprus (1960–1977), Archbishop of Cyprus Makarios III, adopted a policy of non-alignment and took part in the 1961 founding meeting of the Non-Aligned Movement in Belgrade.

The 1974 Turkish invasion of Cyprus and the subsequent and ongoing dispute, in which Turkey continues to occupy Northern Cyprus, complicates Cyprus' relations with NATO. Any treaty concerning Cyprus' participation in NATO, either as a full member, PfP or Euro-Atlantic Partnership Council, would likely be vetoed by Turkey, a full member of NATO, until the dispute is resolved. NATO membership for a reunified Cyprus has been proposed as a solution to the question of security guarantees, given that all three of the current guarantors under the Treaty of Guarantee (1960) (Greece, Turkey and the United Kingdom) are already NATO members.

Cyprus has historically followed a non-aligned foreign policy, although it increasingly identifies with the West in its cultural affinities and trade patterns, and maintains close relations with the rest of the European Union (including Greece), as well as Armenia, Lebanon, and Russia.

The prime originator of Cypriot non-alignment was Archbishop of Cyprus Makarios III, the first President (1960–1977) of the independent republic of Cyprus.

Intercommunal rivalries and movements for union with Greece or partial union with Turkey  persuaded Makarios to steer clear of close affiliation with either side. In any case Cyprus became a high-profile member of the Non-Aligned Movement and retained its membership until its entry into the European Union in 2004.  At the non-governmental level, Cyprus has also been a member of the popular extension of the Non-Aligned Movement, the Afro-Asian Peoples' Solidarity Organisation hosting high-level meetings.

Immediately after the 1974 coup d'état and the Turkish invasion, Makarios secured international recognition of his administration as the legitimate government of the whole island. This was disputed only by Turkey, which currently recognizes only the Turkish Republic of Northern Cyprus, established in 1983.

Since the 1974 invasion, the chief aim of the foreign policy of the Republic of Cyprus has been to secure the withdrawal of Turkish forces and the reunification of the island under the most favorable constitutional and territorial settlement possible.  This campaign has been pursued primarily through international forums such as the United Nations and the Non-Aligned Movement, and in recent years through the European Union.

2004-present: European Union membership 

One of the requirements of the 2004 enlargement of the European Union was for Cyprus to leave the Non-Aligned Movement.

Cyprus is one out of six European Union (EU) member states outside the North Atlantic Treaty Organization (NATO), and the only one not to participate in NATO's Partnership for Peace (PfP) program.

Since the entry into force of the Treaty of Lisbon in 2009, the EU mutual solidarity clause applies to Cyprus along with other EU member states:

Article 42.2 specifies however that NATO shall be the main forum for the implementation of collective self-defence for EU member states that are also NATO members. The other EU member states that are outside NATO and consequently resort to the EU's Common Security and Defence Policy (CSDP, which has a much smaller structures and capabilities than NATO's command structure).

Attempts to join the Partnership for Peace

The Parliament of Cyprus voted in February 2011 to apply for membership of NATO's Partnership for Peace programme. President Demetris Christofias vetoed the decision however, as it would hamper his attempts to negotiate an end to the Cyprus dispute and demilitarize the island. Turkey, a full member of NATO, is likely to veto any attempt by Cyprus to engage with NATO until the dispute is resolved. The winner of Cyprus' presidential election in February 2013, Nicos Anastasiades, stated that he intended to apply for membership in the PfP program soon after taking over. Foreign minister Nicos Christodoulides dismissed Cypriot membership of NATO or Partnership for Peace, preferring to keep Cyprus’ foreign and defence affairs within the EU framework, i.e. the Common Security and Defence Policy (CSDP).

See also
 Foreign relations of Cyprus
 Cyprus and the Non-Aligned Movement
 Cyprus problem
 Foreign relations of NATO 
 Enlargement of NATO 
 NATO open door policy
 Partnership for Peace
 European Union–NATO relations 

NATO relations of other EU member states outside NATO:
Austria–NATO relations
Finland–NATO relations
Ireland–NATO relations
Malta–NATO relations
Sweden–NATO relations

Cyprus's foreign relations with NATO member states:

  Albania
  Belgium
  Bulgaria
  Canada
  Croatia
  Czech Republic
  Denmark
  Estonia
  France
  Germany
  Greece
  Hungary
  Iceland
  Italy
  Latvia
  Lithuania
  Luxembourg
  Montenegro
  Netherlands
  North Macedonia
  Norway
  Poland
  Portugal
  Romania
  Slovakia
  Slovenia
  Spain
  Turkey
  United Kingdom
  United States

References

Foreign relations of Cyprus
NATO relations